The 2010–11 season is the Cornish Pirates eighth season in the second tier of the English rugby union league system, the RFU Championship and their second in the British and Irish Cup.

Pre–season friendlies

RFU Championship

Stage one matches
Stage one is a league programme of 22 matches starting on Saturday 4 September 2010 and completed by Saturday 19 February 2011. Each team play 11 matches at home and 11 away with the top eight teams qualifying for the promotion play–offs and bottom four play in the relegation play–off.

Stage one league table

Stage two matches
Stage two was a programme of six matches starting on Saturday 12 March 2011 and completed by Saturday 16 April 2011. Each team played three matches at home and three away with the top two teams from each group qualifying for the semi–finals.

Stage two league table

Semi-finals

Final

British and Irish Cup

Pool A matches 

 Match v Currie was originally due to be played at Malleny Park, Currie but moved to the Mennaye because of the freezing weather in Scotland.

Pool A table

Coaching staff 
 High Performance Manager - Chris Stirling
 Forwards coach – Ian Davies
 Backs coach – Harvey Biljon
 Strength and conditioning coach – Simon Raynes

See also

 2011–12 Cornish Pirates RFC season

References

External links 
Cornish Pirates
Cornish Pirates unofficial fans site
Cornish Rugby

Cornish Pirates seasons
Cornish Pirates
Cornish Pirates